Keith Saunders (born December 23, 1984) is a former gridiron football linebacker for the Winnipeg Blue Bombers of the Canadian Football League. He was signed by the Miami Dolphins as an undrafted free agent in 2008. He played college football at Alabama.

Early years
Saunders played both defensive end and tight end at Holy Cross High School.

References

External links
Alabama Crimson Tide bio

1984 births
Living people
Holy Cross Academy (New Jersey) alumni
People from Willingboro Township, New Jersey
American football defensive ends
American football linebackers
Alabama Crimson Tide football players
Miami Dolphins players
Winnipeg Blue Bombers players